Michael F. Stanislawski (born 1952) is the Nathan J. Miller Professor of Jewish History at Columbia University.

He obtained his B.A. (1973), M.A. (1975) Ph.D. (1979) from Harvard University, and has been at Columbia since 1980. His dissertation, Tsar Nicholas I and the Jews: The Transformation of Jewish Society in Russia, 1825-1855, was published in 1983.

Other notable books by Stanislawski include Zionism and the Fin de Siècle: Cosmopolitanism and Nationalism from Nordau to Jabotinsky (2001), For Whom Do I Toil?: Judah Leib Gordon and the Crisis of Russian Jewry (1988), Autobiographical Jews (2004).

His most recent book, A Murder in Lemberg (2007), chronicles the murder of a reformist rabbi by an Orthodox Jew in the Ukrainian city of Lemberg (now Lviv).

Stanislawski is credited as being a key intellectual in the transformation of Jewish historiography that has "embedded the narrative about the Jews in the context of Enlightenment thought, national politics, and the treatment of minorities generally."

Awards 
1984: National Jewish Book Award in Jewish History for Tsar Nicholas I and the Jews: The Transformation of Jewish Society in Russia, 1825-1855

References

Jewish American historians
Historians of Jews and Judaism
Harvard University alumni
Columbia University faculty
Writers on Zionism
1952 births
Living people
21st-century American historians
21st-century American male writers
American male non-fiction writers
21st-century American Jews